Castle Island may refer to:

Bermuda
Castle Island, Bermuda, one of the islands of Castle Harbour, Bermuda
Castle Islands Fortifications, Bermuda

Canada
Castle Island, Manitounuk Islands, Nunavut

Greenland
Castle Island (Greenland), an island in Sherard Osborn Fjord

Ireland
Castle Island (County Cork), and uninhabited island in Roaringwater Bay (51.507518N, 9.504267W)
Castle Island (County Roscommon), an island in Lough Key
Castleisland, a town in County Kerry, Ireland

New Zealand
 Castle Island, New Zealand

United Kingdom
Castle Island, County Down, a townland in County Down, Northern Ireland
Castle Island, County Antrim, a townland in County Antrim, Northern Ireland
 Castle Island, Scotland

United States
Castle Island (Massachusetts), an island in Boston Harbor
Castle Island (New York), formerly an island in the Hudson River currently part of the Port of Albany-Rensselaer in Albany, New York
Castle Island (Washington), one of the San Juan Islands